César Aira (born 23 February 1949 in Coronel Pringles, Buenos Aires Province) is an Argentinian writer and translator, and an exponent of contemporary Argentinian literature. Aira has published over a hundred short books of stories, novels and essays. In fact, at least since 1993, a hallmark of his work is a truly frenetic level of writing and publication—two to five novella-length books each year. He has lectured at the University of Buenos Aires, on Copi and Arthur Rimbaud, and at the University of Rosario on Constructivism and Stéphane Mallarmé, and has translated and edited books from France, England, Italy, Brazil, Spain, Mexico, and Venezuela.

His work
Besides his fiction, and the translation work he does for a living, Aira also writes literary criticism, including monographic studies of Copi, the poet Alejandra Pizarnik, and the nineteenth-century British limerick and nonsense writer Edward Lear.  He wrote a short book, Las tres fechas (The Three Dates), arguing for the central importance, when approaching some minor eccentric writers, of examining the moment of their lives about which they are writing, the date of completion of the work, and the date of publication of the work.  Aira also was the literary executor of the complete works of his friend the poet and novelist Osvaldo Lamborghini (1940–1985).

Style
Aira has often spoken in interviews of elaborating an avant-garde aesthetic in which, rather than editing what he has written, he engages in a "flight forward" (fuga hacia adelante) to improvise a way out of the corners he writes himself into. Aira also seeks in his own work, and praises in the work of others (such as the Argentine-Parisian cartoonist and comic novelist Copi), the "continuum" (el continuo) of a constant momentum in the fictional narrative.  As a result, his fictions can jump radically from one genre to another, and often deploy narrative strategies from popular culture and "subliterary" genres like pulp science fiction and television soap operas. He frequently refuses to conform to generic expectations for how a novel ought to end, leaving many of his fictions quite open-ended.

While his subject matter ranges from Surrealist or Dadaist quasi-nonsense to fantastic tales set in his Buenos Aires neighborhood of Flores, Aira also returns frequently to Argentina's nineteenth century (two books translated into English, The Hare and An Episode in the Life of a Landscape Painter, are examples of this; so is the best-known novel of his early years, Ema la cautiva (Emma, the Captive)).  He also returns regularly to play with stereotypes of an exotic East, such as in Una novela china, (A Chinese Novel); El volante (The Flyer), and El pequeño monje budista (The Little Buddhist Monk).  Aira also enjoys mocking himself and his childhood home town, Coronel Pringles, in fictions such as Cómo me hice monja (How I Became a Nun), Cómo me reí (How I Laughed), El cerebro musical (The Musical Brain) and Las curas milagrosas del doctor Aira (The Miraculous Cures of Dr. Aira).  His novella La prueba (1992) served as the basis—or point of departure, as only the first half-hour follows the novella—of Diego Lerman's film Tan de repente (Suddenly) (2002).  His novel Cómo me hice monja (How I Became a Nun) was selected as one of the ten best publications in Spain in the year 1998.

Awards and honours 
 Konex Award – translation (1994)
 Konex Award – novel (2004)
 Prix Roger Caillois (2014)
 Neustadt International Prize for Literature – finalist (2014)
 Man Booker International Prize – finalist (2015)
 America Awards (2016)
 Manuel Rojas Ibero-American Narrative Award (2016)
 Prix Formentor (2021)

Bibliography
A partial bibliography:

Novels

Pamphlets and standalone short stories

 El infinito (1994). Vanagloria Ediciones 
 La pastilla de hormona (2002). Belleza y Felicidad 
 Mil gotas (2003). Eloísa Cartonera 
 El cerebro musical (2005). Eloísa Cartonera 
 El todo que surca la nada (2006). Eloísa Cartonera 
 Picasso (2007). Belleza y Felicidad 
 El perro (2010). Belleza y Felicidad 
 El criminal y el dibujante (2010). Spiral Jetty 
 El té de Dios (2010). Mata-Mata 
 La Revista Atenea (2011). Sazón Ediciones Latinoamericanas 
 El hornero (2011). Sazón Ediciones Latinoamericanas 
 En el café (2011). Belleza y Felicidad
 A brick wall (2012). Del Centro

Stories originally published in magazines

 "El sultán" (1991) in Paradoxa magazine, Vol. 6, No. 6, pp. 27–29. 
 "El hornero" (1994/1995) in Muela de Juicio magazine, Vol. 9, No. 5, pp. 2–4. 
 "Pobreza" (1996) in Muela de Juicio magazine, Vol. 11, No. 6, pp. 2–3. 
 "Los osos topiarios del Parque Arauco" in Paula magazine. 
 "El té de Dios" (2011) in the Mexican edition of Playboy magazine.

Short story collections

 La trompeta de mimbre (1998). Beatriz Viterbo
 Tres historias pringlenses (2013). Ediciones Biblioteca Nacional
 Relatos reunidos (2013). Mondadori
 El cerebro musical (2016). Literatura Random House

Essays and non-fiction

 Copi (1991). Beatriz Viterbo
 Nouvelles Impressions du Petit-Maroc (1991). Meet (French/Spanish bilingual)
 Taxol: precedido de 'Duchamp en México' y 'La broma''' (1997). Simurg
 "La nueva escritura", La Jornada Semanal, Ciudad de México, 12 April 1998 (an English translation The New Writing, published in The White Review, July 2013)
 Alejandra Pizarnik (1998). Beatriz Viterbo
 Cumpleaños (2000, 2001). Mondadori – Autobiographical essay
 Diccionario de autores latinoamericanos (2001). Emecé
 Alejandra Pizarnik (2001). Ediciones Omega
 Las tres fechas (2001). Beatriz Viterbo
 Edward Lear (2004). Beatriz Viterbo
 Pequeno manual de procedimentos (2007). Arte & Letra

 Continuación de ideas diversas (2014). Ediciones Universidad Diego Portales
 Sobre el arte contemporáneo seguido de En La Habana (2016). Literatura Random House 
 Cuatro Ensayos (2020). Beartiz Viterbo – including Aira's essay "Las tres fechas" and his essays on Alejandra Pizarnik, Edward Lear, and Copi.
 Una educación defectuosa: Discurso de recepción del Premio Formentor (2022). Urania 

Works in English translation The Hare (trans. Nick Caistor; 1997)  (Serpent's Tail)An Episode in the Life of a Landscape Painter (trans. Chris Andrews; 2006)  (New Directions)How I Became a Nun (trans. Chris Andrews; 2007)  (New Directions)Ghosts (trans. Chris Andrews; 2009)  (New Directions)The Literary Conference (trans. Katherine Silver; 2010)  (New Directions)The Seamstress and the Wind (trans. Rosalie Knecht; 2011)  (New Directions)The Musical Brain (trans. Chris Andrews; 5 December 2011) in The New Yorker magazineVaramo (trans. Chris Andrews; 2012)  (New Directions)The Miracle Cures of Dr. Aira (trans. Katherine Silver; October 2012)  (New Directions)The Hare (trans. Nick Caistor; June 2013)  (New Directions)Shantytown (trans. Chris Andrews; November 2013)  (New Directions)The Conversations (trans. Katherine Silver; June 2014)  (New Directions)Picasso (trans. Chris Andrews; 11 August 2014) in The New Yorker magazineCecil Taylor (trans. Chris Andrews; 13 February 2015) in BOMB magazineThe Musical Brain: And Other Stories (trans. Chris Andrews; March 2015)  (New Directions)Dinner (trans. Katherine Silver; October 2015)  (New Directions)Ema the Captive (trans. Chris Andrews; 6 December 2016)  (New Directions)The Little Buddhist Monk and The Proof (trans. Nick Caistor) , New Directions, US (2017)The Little Buddhist Monk (trans. Nick Caistor) , And Other Stories, UK, (2017)
 The Proof (trans. Nick Caistor) , And Other Stories, UK (2017)The Linden Tree (trans. Chris Andrews) , New Directions, US (2018); As The Lime Tree , And Other Stories, UK (2018)Birthday (trans.
 Artforum (trans. Katherine Silver) , New Directions, US (2020)The Divorce (trans. Chris Andrews) , New Directions, US (2021)

Studies of Aira's work

Alfieri, Carlos, Conversaciones: Entrevistas a César Aira, Guillermo Cabrera Infante, Roger Chartier, Antonio Muñoz Molina, Ricardo Piglia y Fernando Savater (Buenos Aires: katz Editores, 2008), 199 pp. 
Arambasin, Nella (ed.), Aira en réseau: Rencontre transdisciplinaire autour du roman de l’écrivain argentin César Aira Un episodio en la vida del pintor viajero / Un épisode dans la vie du peintre voyageur (Besançon: Presses universitaires de Franche-Comté, 2005), 151 pp. 
Capano, Daniel A., "La voz de la nueva novela histórica: La estética de la clonación y de la aporía en La liebre de César Aira," in Domínguez, Mignon (ed.), Historia, ficción y metaficción en la novela latinoamericana contemporánea (Buenos Aires: Corregidor, 1996), pp. 91–119. 
Contreras, Sandra, Las vueltas de César Aira (Rosario: Beatríz Viterbo Editora, 2002), 320 pp. 
Decock, Pablo, "El transrealismo en la narrativa de César Aira," in Fabry, Geneviève, and Claudio Canaparo (eds.), El enigma de lo real: Las fronteras del realismo en la narrativa del siglo XX (Oxford and Bern: Lang, 2007), pp. 157–168. 
Decock, Pablo, Las figuras paradojicas de Cesar Aira: Un estudio semiótico y axiológico de la estereotipia y la autofiguración (Bern: Peter Lang, 2014), 344 pp. 
Estrin, Laura,  César Aira: El realismo y sus extremos (Buenos Aires: Ediciones Del Valle, 1999), 79 pp. 
Fernández, Nancy, Narraciones viajeras: César Aira y Juan José Saer (Buenos Aires: Editorial Biblos, 2000), 190 pp. 
García, Mariano, Degeneraciones textuales: Los géneros en la obra de César Aira (Rosario: Beatríz Viterbo Editora / Consorcio de Editores, 2006), 320 pp. 
Klinger, Diana Irene, Escritas de si, escritas do outro: O retorno do autor e a virada etnográfica: Bernardo Carvalho, Fernando Vallejo, Washington Cucurto, João Gilberto Noll, César Aira, Silviano Santigo (Rio de Janeiro: 7Letras, 2007), 187 pp. 
Lafon, Michel, Cristina Breuil, Margarita Remón-Raillard, and Julio Premat (eds.), César Aira, Une Révolution (Grenoble: Université Stendhal – Grenoble 3, Tigre, 2005), 311 pp. 
Mattoni, Silvio, "César Aira," in Arán, Pampa (et al.) (eds.), Umbrales y catástrofes: Literatura argentina de los '90 (Argentina: Epoké, 2003), 258 pp. 
Peñate Rivero, Julio, "¿Una poética del viaje en la narrativa de César Aira?" in Peñate Rivero, Julio (ed.), Relato de viaje y literaturas hispánicas [Papers from an international colloquium organized by the University of Fribourg, May 2004] (Madrid: Visor Libros, 2004), pp. 333–351. 
Pitol, Sergio, and Teresa García Díaz (eds.), César Aira en miniatura: Un acercamiento crítico (Xalpa, Veracruz: Instituto de Investigaciones Lingüístico-Literarias, Universidad Veracruzana, 2006), 188 pp. 
Scramim, Susana, Literatura do presente: História e anacronismo dos textos (Chapecó: Argos Editora Universitária, 2007), 190 pp.
Strafacce, Ricardo, César Aira, un catálogo (Buenos Aires: Mansalva, 2014), 264 pp.

References

"The Literary Alchemy of Cesar Aira ". The Quarterly Conversation. January 2007. Sitemeter.
Galchen, Rivka. 2011. "Into the unforeseen: A romance of César Aira" Harper's Magazine June 2011, pp. 54–63.

External links
 Unmanageable Realities: On César Aira , Marcela Valdes, The Nation, 10 April 2012
 The Essential Gratuitousness of César Aira, David Kurnick, Public Books, 11 January 2014
Biography and work (Spanish)
A conversation about Cesar Aira with his English-language translators on The Marketplace of Ideas''
My Ideal is the Fairy Tale. An interview with César Aira Video by Louisiana Channel
Literature is the queen of the arts. A stage interview with César Aira, 2012 Video by Louisiana Channel
 "César Aira at the international literature festival berlin"
Cesar Aira recorded at the Library of Congress for the Hispanic Division's audio literary archive on 15 March 2015

1949 births
Living people
People from Coronel Pringles
Argentine dramatists and playwrights
Argentine essayists
Argentine translators
Argentine male writers
Argentine novelists
Male essayists
English–Spanish translators
Translators of William Shakespeare
Prix Roger Caillois recipients